Orient Eagle Airways was an airline based in Kazakhstan, operating VIP charter flights for the Government of Kazakhstan.

History
The airline was founded in late 1997 and acquired two aircraft: A Boeing 737-200 (which was written off in 1998, see below) and a larger Boeing 757-200. The latter was sold to Berkut Air in early 2002, marking the moment when Orient Eagle Airways was shut down.

Accidents and incidents
On 12 April 1998 at 08:48 UTC, the Boeing 737-200 of Orient Eagle Airways (registered P4-NEN) overran the runway at Almaty International Airport in a bad-weather landing. The right main landing gear collapsed, by which the aircraft was damaged beyond repair. All 80 passengers and 8 crew members on board survived.

References

Defunct airlines of Kazakhstan
Airlines established in 1997
Airlines disestablished in 2002
1997 establishments in Kazakhstan